Geison Moura (born July 16, 1986 in São Caetano do Sul) is a Brazilian footballer.

Career

Brazil
Moura signed his first professional contract in 2004 when he joined Bahia, then of the Brazilian second division. In 2005, he returned home to the São Paulo state to join Portuguesa Santista of the third division.

United States
Moura moved to the United States in 2007 to join the New Jersey Ironmen of the Major Indoor Soccer League. He played nine games for the Ironmen, scoring two goals, before joining the Rockford Rampage for the 2008-2009 season. He was signed by the NSC Minnesota Stars of the USSF Division 2 Professional League in May 2010, and made his debut for the team on May 22, 2010 in a game against Miami FC.

Moura was released by NSC Minnesota on November 29, 2011. Moura rejoined Minnesota United FC in 2012 and was released at the end of the 2013 NASL Spring Championship.

Singapore
Moura joined Hougang United FC in Singapore's S.League in December 2013.

United States
Moura rejoined Minnesota United FC in April 2015.

Honours

Club
NSC Minnesota Stars
North American Soccer League (1): 2011

Individual
Major Indoor Soccer League Most Valuable Player Award: 2011-12

References

External links
 Official Website of Geison Moura

1986 births
Living people
Brazilian footballers
Brazilian expatriate footballers
Esporte Clube Bahia players
Associação Atlética Portuguesa (Santos) players
Expatriate soccer players in the United States
Minnesota United FC (2010–2016) players
USSF Division 2 Professional League players
North American Soccer League players
Missouri Comets players
Major Indoor Soccer League (2008–2014) players
Association football forwards
Expatriate footballers in Singapore
Hougang United FC players
Singapore Premier League players
Fort Lauderdale Strikers players
Brazilian expatriate sportspeople in the United States
Brazilian expatriate sportspeople in Singapore